Mohammad Abdul Muktadir was a Bengali geologist and academic who was killed in the 1971 Dhaka University massacre. He is considered a martyr in Bangladesh.

Early life
Abdul Muktadir was the third child born into a Bengali Muslim family in Pashchimpara, Silam, Sylhet District on 19 February 1940. His mother was Begum Moshaheda Khanom. His father Abdul Jabbar was a renowned Moulvi and social activist, as well as the founder and headmaster of Silam PL Junior High School. Abdul Jabbar also used to voluntarily teach at the Jalalpur Alia Madrasa in Sylhet Sadar. Abdul Muktadir had two brothers and four sisters. His youngest brother was Abdul Qadir Jalaluddin.

Abdul Muktadir studied in Chakerbazar Government Primary School and then Silam PL Junior High School. In 1956 he graduated from Raja G. C. High School and in 1958 from Sylhet Government College. He completed bachelors and masters in geology from Dhaka University in 1960 and 1962 respectively.

Career
In July 1963, Muktadir was an assistant geologist with the East Pakistan Water and Power Development Authority. He then joined the faculty of Dhaka University on 19 October 1964 as a lecturer of geology. He earned his PhD in hydrology in the University of London. He received further training on hydrology as part of technical assistance from the British Government. By 1968 at least, he was a senior lecturer. He intended to travel to the United States for further research.

Death and legacy
Abdul Muktadir was killed by the Pakistan Army on 25 March 1971 at the onset of Operation Searchlight during the Dhaka University massacre. He was reportedly getting ready for Fajr prayer with his three-month pregnant wife, when someone knocked on his door at his ground floor flat. Opening the door, he was grabbed by the men and shot at his own residence at Number 12 Fuller Road. He and his wife then ran upstairs, taking shelter in the third floor at the flat of Dr Syed Ali Naki. They could not sleep seeing fire outside the window and hearing screams and the sounds of the army vehicles. At sunrise, they could see from the window that 10 to 15 soldiers were walking towards the estate holding pieces of paper. The soldiers ordered them to come downstairs. Ali Naki went down and was attacked by 4 to 5 soldiers. Abdul Muktadir and his wife were standing at the balcony. A soldier entered and said to Abdul Muktadir "tum Joy Bangla bolta, Pakistan nahi chahta" before shooting him at his chest and stomach whilst his wife begged for the soldier to stop. She stood twice at gunpoint whilst pregnant and both times the soldier pushed her away. Before getting up for the third time, Abdul Muktadir was dead. His body was dragged and dumped either at a mass grave in Rayerbazar with some of his other colleagues or as some sources say at Iqbal Hall (now Sergeant Zahurul Huq Hall). After recovering his body, his relatives buried him near a mosque situated next to his father-in-law's house at 78/A Purana Paltan.

The University of Dhaka's Geology Department named their museum after him as Shahid Muktadir Museum. Postage stamps were issued by the government to honour him. In his village in Sylhet, a primary school was established named Dr. Muktadir Academy. Professor Sadruddin Ahmed Chowdhury of Shahjalal University of Science and Technology has considered starting a chair at his university named after Abdul Muktadir.

References

1940 births
1971 deaths
20th-century geologists
Pakistani geologists
Alumni of the University of London
People killed in the Bangladesh Liberation War
Academic staff of the University of Dhaka
People from Dakshin Surma Upazila